Paul Platero (October 5, 1942 – November 16, 2020) was a Navajo linguist. He was born into the Water’s Edge Clan for the Two Who Came To the Water Clan. He was a student of the late MIT linguistics professor Ken Hale. Platero earned his Ph.D. in linguistics from MIT, with a dissertation on the relative clause in Navajo.

He published articles about the syntax and grammar of Navajo, and co-edited an overview of the Athabaskan languages.

Platero taught the Navajo language at institutions including Swarthmore College and the Navajo Language Academy, and also participated in language revitalization efforts to promote the use of Navajo among Navajo youth.

Selected works

 2000 The Athabaskan Languages

References

20th-century Native Americans
21st-century Native Americans
MIT School of Humanities, Arts, and Social Sciences alumni
Native American linguists
Navajo scientists
Linguists of Navajo
21st-century linguists
Native American educators
Linguists from the United States